Helen Andrews (born Helen Rittelmeyer) is an American right-wing political commentator and author. She is a senior editor at The American Conservative and the former managing editor of the Washington Examiner.

Early life
Andrews received a BA in religious studies from Yale University.

Views
In one profile, her views were described as follows: “The political figure Andrews most admires is Marine Le Pen, the leader of France's far-right National Front party, but Trump is not far behind in her estimation. ‘I know a lot of people in the US like him because he's a bomb-thrower, speaks his mind, upsets the establishment,’ she says. ‘Those are things about him that I like, too. But I guess I'm probably in the minority of people who gravitated to Trump primarily based on policy rather than style.’” Following the start of the 2022 Russian invasion of Ukraine Andrews signed onto a letter appearing in Compact  that called for "prudence" by Western policymakers to avoid war with Russia.

Books
Boomers: The Men and Women Who Promised Freedom and Delivered Disaster (Sentinel, 2021)

References

External links

 

Living people
Year of birth missing (living people)
Yale University alumni
American writers